Trilla is a commune in the Pyrénées-Orientales department in southern France.

Its inhabitants are called Trillanais, or Trilhanols in Occitan.

Geography 
Trilla is located in the canton of La Vallée de l'Agly and in the arrondissement of Prades.

Population

See also
Communes of the Pyrénées-Orientales department

References

Communes of Pyrénées-Orientales
Fenouillèdes